Phryneta marmorea is a species of flat-faced longhorn beetles belonging to the family Cerambycidae.

It is present in Madagascar.

References

Phrynetini